The 2012 Rugby League Asian Cup is the inaugural edition of the Rugby League Asian Cup which was contested by the Philippines and Thailand. The two participating teams played a single match against each other. This match was the first international held in Asia.

Match details

Asian Cup
Rugby league matches
2012 in Thai sport
Rugby League Asian Cup
Rugby league in Thailand